Austria competed at the 2015 World Aquatics Championships in Kazan, Russia from 24 July to 9 August 2015.

Diving

Austrian divers qualified for the individual spots at the World Championships.

Men

Open water swimming

Austria has qualified one swimmer compete in the open water marathon.

Swimming

Austrian swimmers have achieved qualifying standards in the following events (up to a maximum of 2 swimmers in each event at the A-standard entry time, and 1 at the B-standard):

Men

Women

Synchronized swimming

Austria has qualified three synchronized swimmers for the following events.

References

External links
Österreichischer Schwimmverband 

Nations at the 2015 World Aquatics Championships
2015 in Austrian sport
Austria at the World Aquatics Championships